Nizhniye Taltsy is a rural locality (a settlement) in Zaigrayevsky District, Republic of Buryatia, Russia. The population was 1,491 as of 2010. There are 56 streets.

Geography 
Nizhniye Taltsy is located 33 km northwest of Zaigrayevo (the district's administrative centre) by road. Ozyorny is the nearest rural locality.

References 

Rural localities in Zaigrayevsky District